Donald Ward McKenzie Jr. (May 11, 1947 – December 3, 2008) was an American competition swimmer, Olympic champion, and former world record-holder.

McKenzie attended Indiana University, where he swam for coach Doc Counsilman's Indiana Hoosiers swimming and diving team in National Collegiate Athletic Association (NCAA) competition during the late 1960s.  He won an individual NCAA national championship in the 100-yard breaststroke while swimming for the Hoosiers.

He competed at the 1968 Olympic Games in Mexico City, where he received a gold medal for winning the men's 100-meter breaststroke.  He won a second gold medal as a member of the winning U.S. team in the men's 4×100-meter medley relay.  The first-place team of Charlie Hickcox, McKenzie, Doug Russell and Ken Walsh set a new world-record time of 3:54.9 in the event final.

McKenzie was inducted as an "Honor Swimmer" into the International Swimming Hall of Fame in 1989. In 2000, he was inducted into the Indiana University Hall of Fame. He was also inducted posthumously into the Los Angeles Valley College Athletic Hall of Fame in 2011.

McKenzie continued to swim after the Olympics. He became a Masters swimmer with the Sierra Nevada Masters and held the men's 50–54 age group 100-yard national breaststroke record with a 1:01.02 in 1998. His record stood until 2010.

Personal life 
As the president of Practice Management Services, he created and supported computer software and systems for medical, dental, and small businesses. He was a real estate investor, counselor, and licensee with Remcor in Reno. He enjoyed the Sierra Nevada Masters and the Pacific Masters Swimming groups as well as golfing, skiing, target shooting, wood working, and racing cars, striving for excellence in all things.

Don was diagnosed with a Stage IV brain tumor (a glioblastoma) in the summer of 2007.  He died on December 3, 2008, due to complications resulting from his brain tumor and was survived by his father and mother, Don and Clarice McKenzie; wife, Syd McKenzie; children, Amy, Ryan and (Andrea), Anne, Emily, and Amanda McKenzie; new granddaughter, Naomi Mackenzie; siblings, Bob and (Kathy) McKenzie and Suzanne and (Steve) Wortman, and a loving family of aunts, uncles, nieces, nephews, cousins, in-laws and friends.

See also
 List of members of the International Swimming Hall of Fame
 List of Indiana University (Bloomington) people
 List of Olympic medalists in swimming (men)
 World record progression 4 × 100 metres medley relay

References

External links
 

1947 births
2008 deaths
American male breaststroke swimmers
World record setters in swimming
Indiana Hoosiers men's swimmers
Olympic gold medalists for the United States in swimming
Swimmers from Los Angeles
Swimmers at the 1968 Summer Olympics
Medalists at the 1968 Summer Olympics